Streptomyces somaliensis is a proteolytic bacterium species from the genus of Streptomyces which has been isolated from a mycetoma from the foot of a man in Somalia. Streptomyces somaliensis is a human pathogen and can cause actinomycosis.

See also 
 List of Streptomyces species

References

Further reading

External links
Type strain of Streptomyces somaliensis at BacDive -  the Bacterial Diversity Metadatabase

somaliensis
Bacteria described in 1948